Bangladesh participated in the 2012 Asian Beach Games in Haiyang, China on 16–22 June 2012. Bangladesh also won 1 bronze medal, finishing first on the medal table.

External links
Competition Schedule

References

Bangladesh
2012
Asian Beach Games